Joox Thailand Music Awards (styled as JOOX Thailand Music Awards), is an annual music awards presented by JOOX Thailand. The awards honor people in the Thai entertainment industry and their achievements in the field of music.

The first ceremony was held on 23 March 2017 at Centerpoint Studio.

Ceremonies

Categories 
As of 2020, there are 19 categories:

Main awards 
 Song of the Year
 Artist of the Year
 New Artist of the Year
 Pop Song of the Year
 Hip-Hop/R&B Song of the Year
 Rock Song of the Year
 Indie Song of the Year
 Remake Song of the Year
 Collaboration Song of the Year
 K-POP Artist of the Year
 International Artist of the Year
 Luk Thung/Pua Chewit of the Year
 Karaoke of the Year
 All Time Hits of the Year

Special awards 
 Most Stylish Male
 Most Stylish Female
 Thailand's Male Sweetheart
 Thailand's Female Sweetheart
 Social Superstar

References

External links 
 

Thai music awards
Awards established in 2017
2017 establishments in Thailand